The Robert L. Pease House is a historic house in Atchison, Kansas. It was built in 1879 for Robert L. Pease, the cashier of the Bank of the State of Kansas. He later worked for the National Mail Company. Pease lived in the house with his wife, Amanda Van Atta Skidmore.

The house was designed in the Italianate architectural style. It has been listed on the National Register of Historic Places since August 26, 1983.

References

Houses on the National Register of Historic Places in Kansas
National Register of Historic Places in Atchison County, Kansas
Italianate architecture in Kansas
Houses completed in 1879